The Paleface is a 1948 American Comedy Western film directed by Norman Z. McLeod and starring Bob Hope as "Painless Potter" and Jane Russell as Calamity Jane. In the movie, Hope sings the song "Buttons and Bows" (by Jay Livingston and Ray Evans). The song won the Academy Award for Best Original Song that year.

The film had a sequel, which is written and directed this time around by its co-writer Frank Tashlin, called Son of Paleface, in 1952. In 1968,  Don Knotts remade the film as The Shakiest Gun in the West.

Plot
Calamity Jane (Jane Russell) is busted out of a sheriff's jail by a couple of government agents under Governor Johnson (Charles Trowbridge) and Commissioner of Internal Affairs Emerson (Stanley Andrews). Johnson and Emerson wish to hire her to uncover white traders illegally selling guns to an Indian tribe near Buffalo Flats, one of the frontier areas; because the agents they previously sent to investigate have turned up dead, they feel they need a new approach and have conceived a plan to use Jane, both as a woman and skilled gunfighter. In return for her services, Johnson and Emerson offer her a full pardon for her past crimes.

The plan is for Jane to meet in Port Deerfield with Jim Hunter, another government agent, pose with him as a married couple, and join a settler's trek to the area where the gun running is taking place. However, the mastermind behind the gun smuggling is revealed to be Jasper Martin (Jackie Searl), Johnson's secretary. Jane finds Hunter dead and herself hounded by assassins. Evading an attempt on her life, she hitches a ride with Peter "Painless" Potter (Bob Hope), a travelling dentist fleeing town following one of his habitual blunders, and marries him to maintain her cover and to coerce him into joining the wagon train. The gun smugglers also join, to ensure delivery of a stash of dynamite and to track the federal agent sent to thwart them, believing Potter is their target. After Potter mistakenly leads part of the wagon train into Indian territory, and while they are taking a rest at a log cabin, the are attacked by the Indians. Locked out, Potter hides inside a barrel and shoots wildly while Jane secretly takes out several Indians from inside. Potter is credited with this achievement, reinforcing the smugglers' assumptions.

After arriving in Buffalo Flats, Jane meets with her contact, Hank Billings (Clem Bevans), and tasks him to find out where the dynamite will be delivered. Meanwhile, the smugglers concoct a plan which results in Potter incurring the wrath of Big Joe, a bad-tempered gunslinger (Jeff York). When this clash leads to a duel, Jane initially plans to allow Potter to be killed, to throw off the smugglers, but instead ends up aiding him again because she wants to use him as a decoy and because she has begun to fall in love with him.

The same night, Billings reports to Jane that the conspirators have hidden the dynamite in the undertaker's shop, then dies from an arrow in his back. Jane manages to manipulate Potter into going to the undertaker's to scope out who comes to pick up the dynamite; she prepares to follow in his wake, but both are captured by the smugglers and taken to the Indians' camp, where Martin has arrived with the rest of his weapons shipment. In order to punish Potter for killing their braves, the medicine man (Henry Brandon) prepares to have Potter ripped apart by two bent-down trees; however, the contraption instead catapults Potter into the forest, leading to the medicine man being banished. While returning to the camp to free Jane, Potter comes upon the medicine man, knocks him out and takes his clothes as a disguise.

Not knowing about the medicine man's banishment, Potter prepares to free Jane from the stake when the tribesmen close in on him. Taking a powder flask, Potter strays through the camp, laying a trail that eventually ignites and blows up some of the smuggled weapons. In the confusion, Jane and Potter escape in Potter's wagon, which is loaded with the dynamite, with the Indians and smugglers on their tail. After Potter drops a lit dynamite stick, he and Jane abandon the wagon just as the smugglers reach it and get themselves blown up. With the mission accomplished, Jane and Potter embark on their honeymoon for real. As the film ends, Jane (in Potter's stead) falls  victim to one of the film's running gags.

Cast
 Bob Hope as Painless Potter
 Jane Russell as Calamity Jane
 Robert Armstrong as Terris
 Iris Adrian as Pepper (singing voice dubbed by Annette Warren)
 Bobby Watson as Toby Preston (as Robert Watson)  
 Jackie Searl as Jasper Martin (as Jack Searl)  
 Joseph Vitale as Indian Scout  
 Charles Trowbridge as Gov. Johnson  
 Clem Bevans as Hank Billings  
 Jeff York as Big Joe  
 Stanley Andrews as Commissioner Emerson  
 Wade Crosby as Jeb  
 Chief Yowlachie as Chief Yellow Feather  
 Iron Eyes Cody as Chief Iron Eyes  
 John Maxwell as Village gossip
 Tom Kennedy as Bartender
 Henry Brandon as Wapato (Medicine Man)
 Francis McDonald as Lance
 Frank Hagney as Greg
 Skelton Knaggs as Pete
 Olin Howland as Undertaker
 George Chandler as First Patient
 Nestor Paiva as Second Patient

Production
The Paleface was filmed at the now defunct Conejo Valley Airport and also at Deerwood Stock Farm, both in Thousand Oaks, California.

The Painless Peter Potter character was to some extent inspired by a real dentist named Painless Parker.

Reception
The Paleface was a critical and commercial success, earning $4.5 million in domestic rentals, which made it Paramount's most successful film of 1948.

The film is recognized by American Film Institute in these lists:
 2004: AFI's 100 Years...100 Songs:	
 "Buttons and Bows" – #87

The film is listed in the reference book 1001 Movies You Must See Before You Die

Radio adaptations
The Paleface was presented on Stars in the Air March 6, 1952. The 30-minute adaptation starred Bob Hope and Jane Russell recreating the roles they had in the film. Hope and Russell also starred in an adaptation on Screen Directors Playhouse on March 3, 1950.

References

External links
 
 
 
 

1948 films
1940s Western (genre) comedy films
American Western (genre) comedy films
Cultural depictions of Calamity Jane
Films that won the Best Original Song Academy Award
Paramount Pictures films
Films directed by Norman Z. McLeod
Films with screenplays by Frank Tashlin
Films scored by Victor Young
1948 comedy films
Films shot in Ventura County, California
1940s English-language films
1940s American films